The Historical and Literary Society, a successor organisation to the Literary Society, was founded in Paris in 1832 as a Polish political and cultural association by a group that included Alexandre Walewski, Napoleon's natural son and future minister of foreign affairs of Napoleon III. Its founding chairman was Adam Jerzy Czartoryski and from 1861, his son, Wladyslaw Czartoryski. The society's original aim was "to collect and publicise materials relating to the former Kingdom of Poland, its current circumstances and future prospects, in the context of maintaining and encouraging in the opinion of nations the sympathy they have directed towards Poland.It found not only sympathy but support and practical assistance in the higher échelons of French society. It is co-owner of the Polish Library in Paris.

History
The society was called into being by the first wave of Polish émigrés fleeing the aftermath of the collapse of the November uprising in partitioned Poland. The society's charter was signed on 29 April 1832. Among its original founding members were Józef Bem, Teodor Morawski, Ludwik Plater, Andrzej Plichta, Jan Nepomucen Umiński. Among influential French supporters were the part Scots, Count Charles Forbes Montalembert; George Sand, Baroness Dudevant; Alfred de Vigny; Félicité de Lamennais and the Marquis de la Fayette.

In 1833 Science and Skills subcommittees were added, while in the period between 1838 and 1842 there was a Statistical section. In 1836 a History subcommittee was formed under chairman Julian Ursyn Niemcewicz, followed by Adam Mickiewicz (1841–1844), and whose de facto administrator was Karol Sienkiewicz. In 1851 the History subcommittee became independent as the 'Historical Society', (Towarzystwo Historyczne). By 1854 it had amalgamated again into the Historical and Literary Society (Towarzystwo Historyczno-Literackie, THL) and since that date has continuously occupied premises at 6, Quai d'Orleans on the Ile Saint-Louis.
In 1838 the publications subcommittee, composed of Eustachy Januszkiewicz, (business partner of the publisher, Aleksander Jełowicki), Walerian Kalinka, Julian Klaczko, doubtless egged on by the tireless administrator, Karol Sienkiewicz, conceived the project of a Polish library in Paris. From 1856 a free-standing publishing committee prepared numerous editions of historical and literary works for publication. In the period 1866–1878 it published the 'Annals of the Historical and Literary Society', (Rocznik Towarzystwa Historyczno-Literackiego.) Allied to the society were periodicals such as: Kronika Emigracji Polskiej, Le Polonais, Wiadomości Polskie.

Between 1839–1859 a London branch was active, managed by Krystyn Lach Szyrma, a professor of philosophy.

In 1886, Napoleon III granted the society the status of an 'Institution of Public Utility' under French law.

Today the complexion and aims of the 400-member strong society are altered. Poland is again an independent though changed state within the European Union. The society meanwhile, is in French terms, a charitable trust and co-owner with the government funded Academy of Learning in Poland, of an enormously valuable and fragile and unique asset, which it helps to run and for which it needs to raise funds. The asset is composed of real-estate but above all, the 19th and 20th-century fragments that bear testimony to a country literally torn apart with no certainty as to its future self-determination. To get to its current position of responsibility, dating only since 2004, the society had to undergo a process of arbitration to reach heads of agreement with its partner owner. It contributes half the delegates that make up the governing council, otherwise known as the Association de la bibliothèque polonaise de Paris which steers the Library collections and the complement of associated museums and art collections, under the umbrella of the Polish Library in Paris. The current chairman is the distinguished nuclear physicist, Professor Kazimierz Lubicz-Zaleski.

The Library

Faced with an existential threat to their centuries-old cultural heritage, Poles of the Great Emigration sought sanctuary in the country of their oldest ally, France. Paris became the undoubted fulcrum of Polish cultural life in exile. It hosted the continuing creativity and debate of a network of notable entrepreneurs, intellectuals, writers, musicians and artists and acted as a 'safe-deposit' for those items of national significance that could be saved and transported away from pillage and conflagration. That need was largely met in 1838, by the acquisition, from public fund-raising, of a building at 8, Quai d'Orleans on the Ile Saint-Louis, to house books and documents. It became the Bibliothèque Polonaise de Paris – the Polish Library in Paris, which is active to this day at the same address.

In summary, a debating society that had taken on the biggest salvage operation it is possible to do, has become a lean board to steer the management of a heritage asset and a research institute that is also a purveyor of cultural events.

See also
Literary Association of the Friends of Poland
Hotel Lambert
Franco-Polish relations

References

Bibliography
Anna Mazanek, Towarzystwo Historyczno-Literackie, w: Literatura Polska, przewodnik encyklopedyczny, Warsaw 1985, v. II
Sławomir Kalembka, Z dziejów czasopiśmiennictwa naukowego emigracji popowstaniowych – "Rocznik Towarzystwa Historyczno-Literackiego w Paryżu'', "Acta Universitatis Nicolai Copernici. Nauki Humanistyczno-Społeczne. Historia", T. XIX, 1984, p. 131–148.

External links
List of Polish archives linked to the society

1832 establishments in France
1886 establishments in France
Great Emigration
Polish emigrants to France
Frédéric Chopin
19th-century Polish writers
Polish literature
Polish Academy of Learning
National academies of arts and humanities
National academies of sciences
Buildings and structures in the 4th arrondissement of Paris
Museums in Paris